Cham-e Rahim (also Romanized as Cham-e Raḩīm) is a village in Hendudur Rural District, Sarband District, Shazand County, Markazi Province, Iran. At the 2006 census, its population was 65, in 15 families.

References 

Populated places in Shazand County